Kostyantyn Vasyliovych Fomin (1903–1964) was a Soviet-Ukrainian footballer, football functionary and war veteran. He was a brother of Volodymyr Fomin and Mykola Fomin.

Kostyantyn Fomin also was a member of OGPU/KGB. He was among the first players of Dynamo Kharkiv along with Mykola Kazakov back in 1925.

Playing career
Kostyantyn started out by playing for the Kharkiv team "Shtandart" in early 1910s when he was 10. In 1920 he volunteered to the Soviet Red Army and participated in fighting the "gangs of Antonov" (by the Soviet propaganda verbiage).

In 1922 he joined a Kharkiv football team of the Society of Sports Amateurs (OLS). Next year Kostyantyn joined another Kharkiv team "Physical Culture Club" (KFK), for which he played next three seasons. In 1926 in Kharkiv was reorganized the local Dynamo football team which gathered under its banner the best city team players of "Shturm" (RabIs, in 1925) as well as most of Kharkiv city football team players who in 1924 won the Soviet football championship. Among those footballers appeared to be and Kostyantyn becoming the first of three Fomins who joined the Kharkiv Dynamo. In his interview Kostyantyn indicated that during 1928 season Dynamo Kharkiv did not have own head coach and that role was performed by the team's captain. He also indicated that the first game of tournament for his team was against Belarus national football team on 19 August 1928.

In 1929 he was invited to Moscow for the local Dynamo where he played for a season and half. In summer of 1930 Kostyantyn returned to Dynamo Kharkiv. In 1932 he was called to the Soviet national football team, for which he actively played until 1935. Soon after capital of Ukraine was moved from Kharkiv to Kyiv, Kostyantyn also moved to Dynamo Kyiv in 1935, with which in 1936 started to play in the newly formed Soviet professional championship in Group A (top tier, a progenitor of the Soviet Top League). In 1936 he was awarded the Merited Master of Sport of the USSR. In 1937 he moved to Lokomotyv Kyiv, with which in 1938 ended his playing career.

During the so-called "Great Patriotic War" (Eastern Front of World War II), Fomin fought at frontlines and earned a battle order of Red Star.

In 1959-64 Kostyantyn Fomin worked as an inspector and a senior methodical adviser at the Tsentralny Stadion imeni V.I.Lenina (Luzhniki Stadium).

Honours
 Soviet Union
 Champion (1): 1924
 Runner-up (2): 1928, spring 1936 (for Dynamo Kyiv)
 Ukrainian SSR
 Champion (4): 1924, 1927, 1928, 1933
 Kharkiv
 Champion: multiple times
 Moscow
 Champion: 1930

Career statistics

Club

International

 Note: Due to sanctions against the Soviet Union, its early games are not recognized by the FIFA.

References

External links
 Фомин Константин. kopanyi-myach.info.
 

1903 births
1964 deaths
Footballers from Kharkiv
People from Kharkovsky Uyezd
KGB officers
Ukrainian footballers
Soviet footballers
FC Dynamo Kharkiv players
FC Dynamo Moscow players
FC Dynamo Kyiv players
FC Lokomotyv Kyiv players
Soviet Top League players
Soviet Second League players
Association football defenders